Bellaire may refer to:

Places

United States
Bellaire, Arkansas
Bellaire, Florida, multiple locations
Bellaire, Kansas, multiple locations
Bellaire, Michigan
Bellaire, Minnesota
Bellaire, Ohio
Bellaire Gardens, Ohio
Bellaire, Pennsylvania
Bellaire, Queens, New York
Bellaire, Texas
Bellaire Boulevard, an arterial street in Houston, Texas

Other places
Bellaire, Durban, South Africa
Bellaire, Wallonia, province of Liège, Belgium

Other uses
Bellaire (LIRR station)
Lake Bellaire
Bellaire (musician)

See also
Bel Air (disambiguation) (includes Bel-Air)
Bel-Aire (disambiguation) (includes Bel Aire)
Belair (disambiguation)
Bellair (disambiguation)
Bellaire High School (disambiguation), several high schools
Bellairs, a surname
Belleair (disambiguation)